Willie Aspinall (8 November 1942 – 23 October 2021) was a professional rugby league footballer who played in the 1960s and 1970s. He played at representative level for Great Britain, and at club level for Warrington (Heritage No. 631), and Rochdale Hornets, as a

Playing career

International honours
Willie Aspinall won a cap for Great Britain while at Warrington on the 1966 Great Britain Lions tour against New Zealand.  He also made 19 non-test match appearances for Great Britain during the 1966 tour.

Club career
Willie Aspinall gained two winners' medals while at Warrington, the 16–5 victory over Rochdale Hornets in the 1965 Lancashire Cup  Final at Knowsley Road, St. Helens on Friday 29 October 1965, and victory in the Lancashire League during the 1967–68 season. He played , and scored a drop goal in Warrington's 2–2 draw with St. Helens in the 1967 Lancashire Cup  Final  at Central Park, Wigan on Saturday 7 October 1967,but did not play in the replay.

He played , in Rochdale Hornets' 16–27 defeat by Warrington in the 1973–74 Player's No.6 Trophy Final at Central Park, Wigan on Saturday 9 February 1974.

Honoured at Warrington Wolves
Willie Aspinall was inducted into the Warrington Wolves Hall of Fame in 2005.

References

External links
Statistics at wolvesplayers.thisiswarrington.co.uk

1942 births
2021 deaths
English rugby league players
Great Britain national rugby league team players
Rochdale Hornets players
Rugby league five-eighths
Rugby league players from St Helens, Merseyside
Warrington Wolves players